Stephanie T. Bolden (born August 16, 1946) is an American politician. She is a Democratic member of the Delaware House of Representatives, representing District 2.

Career 
Bolden earned her B.S. from Delaware State University and her M.Ed from Boston College. She was formerly an educator in Christiana School District and in higher education.

Bolden was a ten-year member of the Wilmington City Council, served a term as its president pro tempore, and is a member of the Delaware Black Caucus.

She was elected to the Delaware House in 2010 after defeating incumbent Hazel Plant in the Democratic primary.

Personal life 
Bolden is Catholic.

Lawsuit and criticism
On January 9, 2018, Bolden filed a lawsuit against the city of Wilmington alleging that the August 7, 2017 fire that started at a neighboring property substantially damaged Bolden's property, which was her childhood home and is the present-day headquarters of the Delaware Black Caucus. The lawsuit also claims that the city of Wilmington failed to secure the property, respond to Bolden's prior complaints and repair and maintain the property to prevent the fire. The fire allegedly caused $75,000 worth of damage to Bolden's property.

Weeks after the lawsuit was filed, Bolden became a part-time receptionist for the Wilmington City Council. She was criticized by Wilmington residents and Democratic Party members for taking the position; they claimed that doing so appeared to be a political favor and that the job should have gone to an unemployed resident of the city. In June 2018, Bolden submitted her resignation from the position, claiming that the job conflicted with her legislative schedule.

Electoral history
In 2010, Bolden was elected after defeating incumbent Democrat Hazel Plant in the Democratic primary, winning the election with 676 votes (51.2%). She was unopposed in the general election, winning 4,485 votes.
In 2012, Bolden defeated a challenge by Arthur Scott, a former state representative, in the Democratic primary, winning with 1,400 votes (62.1%). She was unopposed in the general election, winning 6,253 votes.
In 2014, Bolden won the general election with 2,393 votes (82%) against Republican nominee Richard Leroi Dyton.
In 2016, Bolden was unopposed in the general election, winning 6,256 votes.
In 2018, Bolden won the Democratic primary with 1,169 votes (59.7%) against Ugundi Jacobs Sr. She was unopposed in the general election, winning 4,693 votes.

Committee assignments
Bolden is currently assigned to the following committees:
House Veterans Affairs Committee
Joint Finance Committee
Appropriations Committee
Economic Development/Banking/Insurance/Commerce Committee
House Education Committee
Gaming & Parimutuels Committee (Vice Chair)
Housing & Community Affairs Committee (Vice Chair)
House Labor Committee
Revenue & Finance Committee (Chair)

References

External links
 Official page at the Delaware General Assembly
 

1946 births
Living people
Democratic Party members of the Delaware House of Representatives
Women state legislators in Delaware
African-American state legislators in Delaware
Delaware city council members
21st-century American women politicians
21st-century American politicians
People from Wilmington, Delaware
Lynch School of Education and Human Development alumni
Delaware State University alumni
African-American city council members
Women city councillors in Delaware
21st-century African-American women
21st-century African-American politicians
20th-century African-American people
20th-century African-American women
African-American Catholics